In algebraic geometry, an Endrass surface is a nodal surface of degree 8 with 168 real nodes, found by . , it remained the record-holder for the most number of real nodes for its degree; however, the best proven upper bound, 174, does not match the lower bound given by this surface.

See also

Barth surface
Sarti surface
Togliatti surface

References

Algebraic surfaces